Thomaz Bellucci and André Sá were the defending champions, but chose not to participate this year

Seeds

Draw

References
 Main Draw

Doubles
2015 ATP Challenger Tour